Gérard Caillaud (10 April 1946 – 28 January 2023) was a French actor and theatre director.

Biography
Born in Poitiers on 10 April 1946, Caillaud studied at the Conservatoire national supérieur d'art dramatique until 1971, when he became a resident of the Comédie-Française. He performed many pieces by Molière until his departure in 1978. On television, he played the role of Capitaine Bonaventure in the series Sœur Thérèse.com.

Gérard Caillaud died on 28 January 2023, at the age of 76.

Filmography

Film
 (1974)
The Accuser (1977)
L'argent des autres (1978)
The Dogs (1979)
Us Two (1979)
Un si joli village (1979)
 (1979)
The Woman Cop (1980)
 (1980)
 (1983)
 (1983)
 (1984)
Until September (1984)
 (1986)
 (1986)
 (1988)
The Mills of Power (1988)
Fanfan (1993)
Les Palmes de M. Schutz (1997)
Ma femme s'appelle Maurice (2002)
 (2004)
Madame Irma (2006)

Television
 (1970)
 (1975)
Commissaire Moulin (1978)
Julien Fontanes, magistrat (1981)
 (1981)
Sœur Thérèse.com (2003–2011)
 (2010)

References

External links

1946 births
2023 deaths
French male stage actors
French theatre directors
People from Poitiers
French male film actors
French male television actors
20th-century French male actors
21st-century French male actors